This is a demography of the population of the Dominican Republic including population density, ethnicity, education level, health of the populace, economic status, religious affiliations and other aspects of the population.

Population

The area was first included in world trade in 1492 where Christopher Columbus docked on the island of Hispaniola.
When Spain occupied the country in 1496, the population consisted of (arawak, Taíno Indians). When Spain returned in 1496, they founded the current capital, Santo Domingo, as the first European city in America. The country came under Spanish rule. France took over the part of Hispaniola that is today Haiti. During the colony era, The Dominican Republic acted as a sugar supplier to Spain and France. Many whites moved to the country during this period.
In 1496, Santo Domingo was built and became the new capital, and remains the oldest continuously inhabited European city in the Americas.
Today, two other large groups have joined, while the indigenous population has completely disappeared. 45% of Dominicans consider themselves Endemic, 18% are white, 16% are black and 9% are mulatto. During the many years that have passed since the great immigration, the race have been mixed and it can be difficult to distinguish. In terms of race, they are all similar to the other Caribbean islands. The Spaniards brought Christianity to the Dominican Republic, and today 95% of the population are Catholics. One last clear remnant of the Spanish colonial era on the population is the language. They speak Spanish.

The proportion of the population aged below 15 in 2010 was 31.2%, 62.8% were aged between 15 and 65 years of age, while 6% were aged 65 years or older.

Vital statistics

UN estimates

Registration of vital events is not universal in the Dominican Republic. The Population Department of the United Nations prepared the following estimates:

Births and deaths

Structure of the population 
Structure of the population (01.07.2017) (Estimates): 

Structure of the population (DHS 2013) (Males 19 686, Females 19 878 = 39 564) :

Fertility and births
Total Fertility Rate (TFR) (Wanted Fertility Rate) and Crude Birth Rate (CBR):

Other demographic statistics 
Demographic statistics according to the World Population Review in 2022.

One birth every 3 minutes	
One death every 8 minutes	
One net migrant every 18 minutes	
Net gain of one person every 5 minutes

Demographic statistics according to the CIA World Factbook, unless otherwise indicated.

Population
10,694,700 (2022 est.)
10,298,756 (July 2018 est.)

Ethnic groups
mixed 70.4% (Mestizo/Indio 58%, Mulatto 12.4%), Black 15.8%, White 13.5%, other 0.3% (2014 est.)

note: respondents self-identified their race; the term "indio" in the Dominican Republic is not associated with people of indigenous ancestry but people of mixed ancestry or skin color between light and dark

Age structure

0-14 years: 26.85% (male 1,433,166/female 1,385,987)
15-24 years: 18.15% (male 968,391/female 937,227)
25-54 years: 40.54% (male 2,168,122/female 2,088,926)
55-64 years: 8.17% (male 429,042/female 428,508)
65 years and over: 6.29% (2020 est.) (male 310,262/female 350,076)

0-14 years: 27.56% (male 1,442,926 /female 1,395,809)
15-24 years: 18.52% (male 969,467 /female 937,765)
25-54 years: 40.28% (male 2,112,813 /female 2,035,902)
55-64 years: 7.71% (male 397,821 /female 396,172)
65 years and over: 5.92% (male 286,300 /female 323,781) (2018 est.)

Median age
total: 27.9 years. Country comparison to the world: 144th
male: 27.8 years
female: 28.1 years (2020 est.)

total: 27.3 years. Country comparison to the world: 145th
male: 27.1 years
female: 27.4 years (2018 est.)

Birth rate
18.03 births/1,000 population (2022 est.) Country comparison to the world: 81st
18.9 births/1,000 population (2018 est.) Country comparison to the world: 84th

Death rate
6.29 deaths/1,000 population (2022 est.) Country comparison to the world: 147th
6.4 deaths/1,000 population (2018 est.) Country comparison to the world: 145th

Total fertility rate
2.21 children born/woman (2022 est.) Country comparison to the world: 86th
2.28 children born/woman (2018 est.) Country comparison to the world: 88th

Net migration rate
-2.68 migrant(s)/1,000 population (2022 est.) Country comparison to the world: 174th
-2.6 migrant(s)/1,000 population (2018 est.) Country comparison to the world: 170th

Population growth rate
0.91% (2022 est.) Country comparison to the world: 106th
0.99% (2018 est.) Country comparison to the world: 109th

Mother's mean age at first birth
20.9 years (2013 est.)
note: median age at first birth among women 25-49

Contraceptive prevalence rate
69.5% (2014)

Dependency ratios
total dependency ratio: 57.8 (2015 est.) Country comparison to the world: 151st
youth dependency ratio: 47.3 (2015 est.)
elderly dependency ratio: 10.5 (2015 est.)
potential support ratio: 9.5 (2015 est.)

Life expectancy at birth

total population: 72.56 years. Country comparison to the world: 151st
male: 70.86 years
female: 74.33 years (2022 est.)

Religions
Roman Catholic 44.3%, Evangelical 13%, Protestant 7.9%, Adventist 1.4%, other 1.8%, atheist 0.2%, none 29.4%, unspecified 2% (2018 est.)

Urbanization
urban population: 83.8% of total population (2022)
rate of urbanization: 1.64% annual rate of change (2020-25 est.)

Languages
Spanish (official)''

Education expenditures
4% of GDP (2019) Country comparison to the world: 102nd

Literacy
definition: age 15 and over can read and write (2016 est.)
total population: 93.8%
male: 93.8%
female: 93.8% (2016 est.)

School life expectancy (primary to tertiary education)
total: 14 years
male: 14 years
female: 15 years (2017)

Unemployment, youth ages 15–24
total: 14.9%
male: 11.6%
female: 20.7% (2020 est.)

See also
Health in the Dominican Republic
Youth in the Dominican Republic

Census information:
1920 Santo Domingo Census
1950 Dominican Republic Census
1960 Dominican Republic Census
1970 Dominican Republic Census
2010 Dominican Republic Census

References